Pierre Marie Léon Augustin Plateau (January 10, 1924 – April 26, 2018) was a French Prelate of the Catholic Church.

Plateau was born in Saint-Servan and ordained a priest on June 28, 1947. Plateau was appointed auxiliary bishop to the Archdiocese of Rennes as well as Titular bishop of Gunela on February 2, 1979, and was consecrated on April 22, 1979. Plateau was appointed to the Archdiocese of Bourges on April 8, 1984, from which he retired on April 25, 2000. As Archbishop he welcomed the Little Sisters Disciples of the Lamb to the archdiocese.

References

External links
Catholic-Hierarchy
Rennes Archdiocese (French)
Bourges Archdiocese (French)

1924 births
2018 deaths
20th-century Roman Catholic bishops in France
21st-century Roman Catholic bishops in France
Archbishops of Bourges
People from Ille-et-Vilaine